The Schermerspitze is a mountain in the Gurgler Kamm group of the Ötztal Alps.

Mountains of Tyrol (state)
Mountains of the Alps
Alpine three-thousanders
Ötztal Alps